The New Brunswick-Prince Edward Island Major Midget Hockey League is a Canadian midget 'AAA' ice hockey league operating in the provinces of New Brunswick and Prince Edward Island.  The inter-branch league operates under the supervision of Hockey New Brunswick and Hockey PEI.

History
The league was created by Hockey New Brunswick and Hockey PEI in 2002 to provide a more competitive development league for both provinces.  The new league replaced the existing major midget leagues in both provinces.  Both branches continue to operate their respective minor midget leagues as feeder leagues for the major midget league.

Upon its formation, it was decided that the league would have six teams – four from New Brunswick and two from PEI.  The five of the six original teams are still in the league today while the Kensington Wild joined in the 2013–2014 season.

Teams

Current

 Charlottetown Knights
 Fredericton Caps
 Kensington Wild
 Moncton Flyers
 Northern Moose
 Saint John Vitos

Former

 Cornwall Superior Thunder

Championship
The team finishing with the best record during the regular season is named league champion.

Separate playoffs are held for the New Brunswick and PEI teams.  The New Brunswick teams play in a two-round playoff to compete for their provincial championship, with the two PEI teams face each other in a playoff series for their championship.  The respective provincial champions qualify for the Telus Cup Atlantic Regional Championship, where they compete for a berth in the national championship.

Champions

2002-03 Fredericton
2003-04 Fredericton
2004-05 Fredericton
2005-06 Saint John
2006-07 Charlottetown 
2007-08 Moncton

2008-09 Moncton
2009-10 Miramichi
2010-11 Fredericton
2011-12 Moncton
2012-13 Moncton
2013-14 Moncton
2014-15 Moncton

References

External links
League Website

Ice hockey leagues in Prince Edward Island
Ice hockey leagues in New Brunswick
Youth ice hockey leagues in Canada